The United–Reform coalition government of New Zealand was the ministry that governed New Zealand from 1931 to 1935. It was a coalition between two of the three major parties of the time, the United and Reform, formed to deal with the Great Depression which began in 1929. The Labour Party refused to join the coalition, as it believed that the only solution to the depression was socialism, which United and Reform did not support. Rather, they attempted to solve the country's economic problems by cutting public spending. This, the policy of making the unemployed do relief work for the unemployment benefit, and other cost-cutting policies, made the government the most unpopular of its era, and it was defeated in the 1935 election.

Significant policies

Economic
 Cut government spending in order to balance the budget.
 The Reserve Bank of New Zealand was established in 1934, beginning the first issue of banknotes for the New Zealand Pound.
 Created the Mortgage Corporation of New Zealand in 1935

Transport 
 Introduced the Transport Licensing Act 1931 to regulate land transport; goods transported further than  would require a permit from the New Zealand Railways Department;

Welfare
 Compelled the unemployed to labour on public works and other activities in exchange for an unemployment benefit.

Education
 Raised school starting age to six in order to save money.
 Closed teachers' colleges as cost-cutting measure.

Formation

The initial coalition between the United and Reform had formed earlier in 1931, following the collapse of an earlier coalition between the United and Labour. Fearing that splitting the anti-Labour vote would result in a Labour government even if it received fewer votes than United and Reform combined, the two parties formed a coalition and an election agreement. In the subsequent election, the coalition won 55.4% of the popular vote, compared to 34.3% for Labour.

Defeat

The government focussed primarily on getting New Zealand out of the depression by cutting government spending and thus balancing the national budget. It dealt with widespread unemployment by initiating relief work, which involved compelling the unemployed to work on a range of projects ranging from useful public works to pointless activity. The government was widely seen as heartless, encapsulated by the commonly believed but probably untrue story that Prime Minister George Forbes had told a delegation of unemployed men to go and eat grass. In the 1935 election, Labour won 46.1% of the popular vote, while the coalition won only 32.9%. However the result in terms of seats was much more overwhelming, with Labour winning 53 seats to the coalition's 16. A further eleven seats were won by minor parties and independents. Following their defeats, the Liberal and Reform parties merged to become the National Party.

Election results

Prime ministers
The government was led by George Forbes of the United Party, with Gordon Coates of Reform as Minister of Finance.

Cabinet Ministers

In 1934 the Minister of Native Affairs Sir Āpirana Ngata resigned as minister after accusations of departmental maladministration and favouritism were supported by a Royal Commission.

See also
 Governments of New Zealand
 New Zealand Liberal Party
 Reform Party (New Zealand)

References and notes

Notes

References 

Ministries of George V
United-Reform coalition
New Zealand Liberal Party
Reform Party (New Zealand)
20th century in New Zealand
Cabinets established in 1931
Cabinets disestablished in 1935
Coalition governments